Reeling: The Chicago LGBTQ+ International Film Festival is an annual film festival held in Chicago, Illinois, dedicated to LGBT film. The inaugural festival took place in April 1981, and is one of the oldest festivals of its kind in the world.

Each year, Reeling showcases a variety of LGBT-themed films, including both features and shorts. The festival is a production of Chicago Filmmakers, a not-for-profit media arts organization that serves the independent film community in Chicago.

Films

References

External links
 

1981 establishments in Illinois
Film festivals in Chicago
LGBT culture in Chicago
LGBT film festivals in the United States
Film festivals established in 1981